Sergei Viktorovich Popov (born 1971) is a Russian businessman and billionaire.

Biography
Popov studied for his Bachelor's Degree in Bachelor of Arts/Science at the Ural Polytechnic Institute.

In 1994, he co-founded Prodcontract, supplying scrap metal to Russia's biggest metallurgical plants. In 1996 he co-founded MDM Business Concern. From 1997 to 1999 he was a partner and business manager of the company.

In 2000 he became co-founder and Chairman of the Board of Directors of MDM Industrial Group. The Group identified three core business sectors: production of pipes, fertilisers and thermal coal, and began acquiring businesses in these sectors. Such large businesses as OAO TMK (one of the leading producers of oil and gas pipelines in the world), SUEK (the largest coal energy company in Russia), and Eurochem (one of the world's leading mineral fertiliser producers) were established. During this period, in 2002, Popov became a 50% partner in MDM Bank.

In 2006, Popov sold the first of his business assets, and in 2016 exited his remaining active investments with the sale of his stake in MDM Bank to B & N Bank.

Popov is a founder member of the Moscow School of Management, Skolkovo.

In 2010 Popov founded a private fund called Agat, which has a mentoring program that offers young businesspeople startup capital.

Net worth 
As per Forbes, his net worth was estimated at $3.1B in 2022, making him the 984th richest person in the world.

References

External links
 Biography 
 Biography  

Russian bankers
1971 births
Living people
Russian billionaires
Russian energy industry businesspeople
Russian businesspeople in manufacturing
People in the chemical industry